The 1979 Peter Jackson Classic was contested from July 26–29 at Richelieu Valley Golf Club. It was the 7th edition of the Peter Jackson Classic, and the first edition as a major championship on the LPGA Tour.

This event was won by Amy Alcott.

Final leaderboard

External links
 The Evening Independent source

Canadian Women's Open
Peter Jackson Classic
Peter Jackson Classic
Peter Jackson Classic
Peter Jackson Classic